Bruneau may refer to:

Places
Bruneau, Idaho, a town in the United States
Bruneau Dunes State Park, Idaho
Bruneau River, in Idaho

Other uses
Bruneau (surname)
Bruneau Restaurant, a Michelin-starred restaurant in Brussels

See also
Bruno (disambiguation)